"" ("Old Comrades") is the title of a popular German military march. It is included in the Armeemarschsammlung as HM II, 150.

History

The march was written around 1889 in Ulm, Germany, by military music composer Carl Teike. Teike wrote many pieces for the marching band of Grenadier-Regiment König Karl (5. Württembergisches) No. 123. When bringing his newly composed march to the regiment, the Kapellmeister Oelte simply told him: "We've got plenty enough of musical marches, put this one in the stove!" This episode eventually led to Teike taking his leave of the band and naming the march as "Alte Kameraden". A publisher purchased the song from him for 25 German Goldmark. In 1895, the Nowaweser Kapelle Fritz Köhler premiered the march. Alte Kameraden later became one of the most popular marches in the world. It was played in 1937 at the coronation ceremony for English King George VI. The march can also be heard in the film Der blaue Engel. Teike later worked as a police officer but also continued composing military marches.

Due to its militaristic connotations, the march was banned in Germany after both World War I and World War II. According to one source, the march became popular among Finnish amateur photography clubs after "kameraden" was mistranslated to "cameramen" in Finnish.

It is the official parade march for the Chilean Air Force's Non Commissioned Officers School ("").

Lyrics

References

Further reading

External links 

Carl Teike on Victor Records

German songs
German military marches
1889 songs
Songs about friendship